Carl Frederick Beeston (born 30 June 1967) is an English former footballer who played in the Football League as a midfielder for Stoke City, Hereford United and Southend United. He was capped once for England under-21s in 1988. He also played non-league football for Hednesford Town and Stafford Rangers.

Career
Beeston was born in Stoke-on-Trent and progressed through the youth ranks at Stoke City making his first team debut against Coventry City on the final day of 1984–85 season with Stoke already relegated. He played six matches in 1985–86 scoring his first senior goal in the Full Members Cup against Coventry. He was missing from the entire 1986–87 season due to contracting glandular fever. He returned to the side and became a vital member of Mick Mills' first team displaying good form as a 'box-to-box' midfielder with an eye for a spectacular goal which earned him a call up to the England U21 side.

Stoke had an awful 1989–90 season which ended with relegation to the third tier which was followed by their lowest league finish of 14th in 1990–91. New manager Lou Macari came in and set about turning around Stoke's fortunes and Beeston played a vital part. He played 57 matches in 1991–92 as Stoke reached the Football League play-offs, losing to Stockport County, although they did beat County in the final of the Football League Trophy.

Beeston played 32 times in 1992–93 as Stoke won the Division Two title but over the summer he had to have his ankle rebuilt by surgeons and he had to miss the entire 1993–94 season. After his return from injury he was never able to reproduce his form in centre midfield and so was used on the right wing and helped Stoke reach the play-offs in 1995–96, losing out to Leicester City. He played 18 times in 1996–97 in what was his final season at the Victoria Ground and left for Southend United after previously spending time out on loan at Hereford United. He brought his career to an end with non-league Hednesford Town and Stafford Rangers.

Career statistics
Source:

Honours
 Stoke City
 Football League Division Two champions: 1992–93
 Football League Trophy winners: 1992

References

1967 births
Living people
Footballers from Stoke-on-Trent
English footballers
Association football midfielders
Stoke City F.C. players
Hereford United F.C. players
Southend United F.C. players
Hednesford Town F.C. players
Stafford Rangers F.C. players
England under-21 international footballers
English Football League players